This is a list of notable and historic figures who have been or are polyamorous. Polyamory 
is the practice of, or desire for, romantic relationships with more than one partner at the same time, with the informed consent of all partners involved.

List

 Courtney Act, drag queen, television host, and singer
 László Ágoston, baritone and marketer
 Olive Byrne, co-creator of the character Wonder Woman
 Richard Carrier, activist, author, blogger, and speaker
 Greta Christina, blogger, speaker, and author
Ian Danskin, YouTuber, most well known for his series on the alt-right.
 Catherine Dorion, artist, activist, and Member of the National Assembly of Quebec (2018–present)
 Gabe Dunn, writer and podcaster
 Dossie Easton, co-author of The Ethical Slut and other works
 Terisa Greenan, writer, actress, filmmaker, and creator of Family: the web series
 Laurell K. Hamilton, writer, known for Anita Blake: Vampire Hunter
 Janet Hardy, writer and sex educator, and founder of Greenery Press
 Brenda Howard, bisexual rights activist
 Elizabeth Holloway Marston, psychologist, co-creator of the character Wonder Woman
 William Moulton Marston, psychologist, lawyer, inventor, and comic book writer who co-created the character Wonder Woman
 Elise Matthesen, author
 Ezra Miller, actor and singer
 Graham Nicholls, English artist and writer, in 2009 founded www.polyamory.org.uk, the United Kingdom's first website about polyamory; at the time he was in a polyamorous triad with two female partners
Darrel Ray, psychologist, speaker and author
Willow Smith, singer, rapper, actress and dancer
Cecilia Tan, writer, editor, sexuality activist, and founder and manager of Circlet Press
Celeste West, librarian and author, known for her alternative viewpoints in librarianship and her authorship of books about lesbian sex and polyfidelity
 Morning Glory Zell-Ravenheart, author and Neopagan An advocate of polyamory, she is credited with coining the word

See also
 List of fictional polyamorous characters

References

Lists of people by activity
People by sexuality